"If Something Should Happen" is a song written by Dave Turnbull, Jim Brown and Dan Demay, and recorded by American country music artist Darryl Worley.  It was released  in February 2005 as the second single from his self-titled album. It peaked at number 9 on Billboard magazine's Hot Country Songs chart for the chart week of June 25, 2005.

Content
The song addresses a father scheduled to go in for surgery to remove what is strongly implied to be cancer, discussing his fears with his childhood friend. He requests the friend look after his family in the event that "something should happen," stopping in with his wife to check on the singer's wife and looking out for his nine year-old son as he grows up.

Music video
The music video was directed by Shaun Silva. It features Worley on top of various buildings, and various places in Nashville, Tennessee.

Chart performance
"If Something Should Happen" debuted at number 52 on the U.S. Billboard Hot Country Singles & Tracks for the week of March 2, 2005.

Year-end charts

References

External links
[  Allmusic]

2004 songs
Darryl Worley songs
2005 singles
Music videos directed by Shaun Silva
Song recordings produced by Frank Rogers (record producer)
DreamWorks Records singles
Songs written by Dave Turnbull